Burslem Market Hall, built in 1879, is a listed building in the centre of Burslem, in Stoke-on-Trent, England. The former market hall was closed in 2003.

History
The first covered market, a stone single-storey building in Classical style, was erected in 1835 on ground east of the town hall; it was demolished in 1953.

Loans were approved by Burslem's Local Government Board in 1877, for a new market hall including shops on the Queen Street frontage with offices above. It was designed by E. M. Richards, the Burslem Board Engineer and Surveyor. The hall was opened on 14 August 1879 by Thomas Hulme, Mayor of Burslem.

The market hall closed in 2003, after masonry fell from the ceiling. The Victorian Society in 2021, commenting that it is in need of vital repairs, placed it among its top 10 endangered buildings. The Society described the building: "The market tells the story of Burslem’s rise and subsequent decline, with its ghost signs and fading advertisements from the Victorian era...."

It was given Grade II listed status on 12 December 2022.

Description
The hall lies between the market place to the north and Queen Street to the south. The frontage on Queen Street (a short distance west of the Grade II* listed Wedgwood Institute), is in red brick with stone dressings, in Gothic style: on the upper floor there are nine bays with arch windows, and on the ground floor a central shop front occupies two bays, other bays having broad stone arches enclosing single business premises.

There are entrance passages to the hall from Keates Street to the east, from Market Passage to the north, and two from Queen Street. Inside the hall, there are stalls in pairs under large arches, some retaining shop signs, lining the east and west sides. On the north wall, there are six-pointed arch recessed panels: in the third arch, an inscribed stone records the opening of the hall in 1879. The hall has a glazed iron roof which used the patented system of W. E. Rendle (1820–1881).

References

Buildings and structures in Stoke-on-Trent
Grade II listed buildings in Staffordshire
Market halls